Andy Williams (born 7 February 1981, in Swansea), is a Welsh international rugby union player. A scrum half, he has attained 5 caps for the Wales national rugby union team.

At the beginning of the 2007–2008 season Williams joined the Welsh region Newport Gwent Dragons from Bath.  He has also previously played for the Ospreys.

In January 2009 his contract with the Dragons was terminated. In September 2009 it was announced that he had joined English Championship side Moseley. Williams joined Gloucester 30 December 2009 in a short-term loan arrangement.

In June 2010 he signed for Worcester Warriors.

References

External links
Newport Gwent Dragons profile
Bath profile
Ospreys profile
Wales profile
European Rugby profile
Gloucester profile

1981 births
Rugby union players from Swansea
Wales international rugby union players
Bath Rugby players
Ospreys (rugby union) players
Dragons RFC players
Cardiff RFC players
Moseley Rugby Football Club players
Gloucester Rugby players
Worcester Warriors players
Living people
People educated at Gowerton Comprehensive School
Sportspeople from Gloucestershire
Rugby union scrum-halves